Choniomyzon is a genus of copepods, containing the following species: One species, C. inflatus, is a parasite of the eggs of the slipper lobster Ibacus novemdentatus.
 Choniomyzon inflatus Wakabayashi et al., 2013
 Choniomyzon libiniae Santos & Björnberg, 2004
 Choniomyzon panuiri Pillai, 1962

References

Siphonostomatoida